Wellesley may refer to:

People

Dukes of Wellington
 Arthur Wellesley, 1st Duke of Wellington (1769–1852), British soldier, statesman, and Prime Minister of the United Kingdom
 Arthur Wellesley, 2nd Duke of Wellington (1807–1884), British politician
 Henry Wellesley, 3rd Duke of Wellington (1846–1900), British soldier and politician
 Arthur Wellesley, 4th Duke of Wellington (1849–1934), British soldier
 Arthur Wellesley, 5th Duke of Wellington (1876–1941), British soldier
 Henry Wellesley, 6th Duke of Wellington (1912–1943), British soldier
 Gerald Wellesley, 7th Duke of Wellington (1885–1972), British soldier and diplomat
 Valerian Wellesley, 8th Duke of Wellington (1915–2014), British soldier
 Charles Wellesley, 9th Duke of Wellington (born 1945), British politician and businessman

Barons Cowley (1828)
 Henry Wellesley, 1st Baron Cowley (1773–1847)
 Henry Richard Charles Wellesley, 2nd Baron Cowley (1804–1884) (created Earl Cowley in 1857)

Earls Cowley (1857)
 Henry Richard Charles Wellesley, 1st Earl Cowley (1804–1884)
 William Henry Wellesley, 2nd Earl Cowley (1834–1895)
 Henry Arthur Mornington Wellesley, 3rd Earl Cowley (1866–1919)
 Christian Arthur Wellesley, 4th Earl Cowley (1890–1962)
 Denis Arthur Wellesley, 5th Earl Cowley (1921–1968)
 Richard Francis Wellesley, 6th Earl Cowley (1946–1975)
 Garret Graham Wellesley, 7th Earl Cowley (1934–2016)
 Garret Graham Wellesley, 8th Earl Cowley (born 30 March 1965), styled Viscount Dangan from 1975 to 2016

The heir apparent is the present holder's son Henry Arthur Peter Wellesley, Viscount Dangan (b. 1991).

Others, including relatives of Dukes
 Arthur Wellesley, Marquess of Douro (born 1978), British businessman
 Lord Charles Wellesley (1808–1858), British politician
 Charles Wellesley (1873–1946), American actor
 Lady Charlotte Wellesley (born 1990), British producer and socialite
 Elizabeth Wellesley, Duchess of Wellington (1820–1904), Mistress of the Robes
 Lady Elizabeth Wellesley (1918–2013), British socialite
 Lord George Wellesley (1889–1967), British soldier
 Richard Wellesley, 1st Marquess Wellesley (1760–1842), Irish peer, statesman, and Governor-General of India
 Walter Wellesley (c. 1470–1539), prior of Great Connell priory and bishop of Kildare

Places and institutions

Australia 

 Wellesley, Queensland, a locality in the Maranoa Region

 Wellesley Islands, an island group in the Gulf of Carpentaria, Queensland, and locality in the Shire of Mornington
South Wellesley Islands, an island group in the Gulf of Carpentaria, Queensland, and locality in the Shire of Mornington
West Wellesley Islands, an island group in the Gulf of Carpentaria, Queensland, and locality in the Shire of Mornington

Canada 

 Wellesley, Ontario, Canada, a township
 Wellesley (TTC), a subway station in Toronto, Ontario

Malaysia 

 Province Wellesley, Penang, Malaysia, known in Malay as Seberang Prai

New Zealand 

 Wellesley College, New Zealand, private boys only independent primary school in New Zealand

United States 

Wellesley, Massachusetts, United States
Wellesley College, private women's liberal arts college in Wellesley, Massachusetts
Wellesley High School, public high school in Wellesley, Massachusetts

Ships 

HMS Wellesley, name of two Royal Navy ships

Other uses

Wellesley & Co., Founded in November 2013, Wellesley provides asset-backed loans secured on residential property.
 The Vickers Wellesley, 1930s single-engine medium bomber of the Royal Air Force
 Wellesley marriage, defunct term for (not necessarily sexual) same-sex cohabitation, see Boston marriage